Sankaran FC is a football club based in Faranah, Guinea. The team plays in the Guinée Championnat National.

Stadium
Currently the team plays at the 1000 capacity Stade Régional de Faranah.

References

External links
Soccerway
Weltfussballarchiv
Rssf

Football clubs in Guinea